Barbara Jane Sparrow  (born July 11, 1935) is a retired Canadian politician.

Political career
Sparrow, a Registered Nurse and businessperson, was first elected to the House of Commons of Canada in the 1984 federal election as Member of Parliament for Calgary South, Alberta. That election brought the Progressive Conservative Party of Canada to power under the leadership of Brian Mulroney. In that election she won the biggest plurality in Canadian history up to that time with 47,763 more votes than second place runner-up Harold Millican from the Liberal Party of Canada.

Sparrow was re-elected in the 1988 general election for the new riding of Calgary Southwest. In 1991, she was named parliamentary secretary to the Minister of National Health and Welfare.

When Kim Campbell succeeded Mulroney as PC leader and prime minister in 1993, she brought Sparrow into the Cabinet as Minister of Energy, Mines and Resources and Minister of Forestry.

Both Sparrow and the Campbell government were defeated in the subsequent 1993 federal election that reduced the Tories to only two seats in the House of Commons.  Sparrow lost her seat to Reform Party leader Preston Manning.

Electoral record

References

External links

1935 births
Living people
Women members of the House of Commons of Canada
Members of the 25th Canadian Ministry
Members of the House of Commons of Canada from Alberta
Politicians from Toronto
Progressive Conservative Party of Canada MPs
Women in Alberta politics
20th-century Canadian women politicians
Women government ministers of Canada
Members of the Junior League